Zinc chloride is the name of inorganic chemical compounds with the formula ZnCl2 and its hydrates. Zinc chlorides, of which nine crystalline forms are known, are colorless or white, and are highly soluble in water. This salt is hygroscopic and even deliquescent.  Zinc chloride finds wide application in textile processing, metallurgical fluxes, and chemical synthesis. No mineral with this chemical composition is known aside from the very rare mineral simonkolleite, Zn5(OH)8Cl2·H2O.

Structure and properties
Four crystalline forms (polymorphs) of ZnCl2 are known: α, β, γ, and δ. Each case features tetrahedral Zn2+ centers.

Here a, b, and c are lattice constants, Z is the number of structure units per unit cell, and ρ is the density calculated from the structure parameters.

The  orthorhombic form (δ) rapidly changes to one of the other forms on exposure to the atmosphere. A possible explanation is that the OH− ions originating from the absorbed water facilitate the rearrangement. Rapid cooling of molten ZnCl2 gives a glass.

Molten ZnCl2 has a high viscosity at its melting point and a comparatively low electrical conductivity, which increases markedly with temperature. As indicated by a Raman scattering study, the viscosity is explained by the presence of polymers,. Neutron scattering study indicated the presence of tetrahedral {ZnCl4} centers, which requires aggregation of ZnCl2 monomers as well..

In the gas phase, ZnCl2 molecules are linear with a bond length of 205 pm.

Hydrates
Five hydrates of zinc chloride are known: ZnCl2(H2O)n with n = 1, 1.5, 2.5, 3 and 4. The tetrahydrate ZnCl2(H2O)4 crystallizes from aqueous solutions of zinc chloride.

Preparation and purification
Anhydrous ZnCl2 can be prepared from zinc and hydrogen chloride:
Zn + 2 HCl → ZnCl2 + H2

Hydrated forms and aqueous solutions may be readily prepared similarly by treating Zn metal, zinc carbonate, zinc oxide, and zinc sulfide with hydrochloric acid:
ZnS + 2 HCl +  4 H2O  → ZnCl2(H2O)4 + H2S
Unlike many other elements, zinc essentially exists in only one oxidation state, 2+, which simplifies the purification of the chloride.

Commercial samples of zinc chloride typically contain water and products from hydrolysis as impurities. Such samples may be purified by recrystallization from hot dioxane. Anhydrous samples can be purified by sublimation in a stream of hydrogen chloride gas, followed by heating the sublimate to 400 °C in a stream of dry nitrogen gas.  Finally, the simplest method relies on treating the zinc chloride with thionyl chloride.

Reactions

Molten anhydrous ZnCl2 at 500–700 °C dissolves zinc metal, and, on rapid cooling of the melt, a yellow diamagnetic glass is formed, which Raman studies indicate contains the  ion.  

A number of salts containing the tetrachlorozincate anion, Zn, are known. "Caulton's reagent", V2Cl3(thf)6Zn2Cl6 is an example of a salt containing Zn2.
The compound Cs3ZnCl5 contains tetrahedral Zn and Cl− anions. No compounds containing the Zn ion have been characterized.

Zinc chloride dissolves readily in water to give ZnClxH2O(4−x) species and some free chloride. Aqueous solutions of ZnCl2 are acidic: a 6 M aqueous solution has a pH of 1. The acidity of aqueous ZnCl2 solutions relative to solutions of other Zn2+ salts (say the sulfate) is due to the formation of the tetrahedral chloro aqua complexes where the reduction in coordination number from 6 to 4 further reduces the strength of the O–H bonds in the solvated water molecules.

In alkali solution, zinc chloride converts to various zinc hydroxychlorides.  These include Zn(OH)3Cl2−, Zn(OH)2, ZnOH, and the insoluble Zn5(OH)8Cl2·H2O. The latter is the mineral simonkolleite. When zinc chloride hydrates are heated, HCl gas evolves and hydroxychlorides result.

When solutions of zinc chloride are treated with ammonia, various complexes of "ammines" are produced.  These include Zn(NH3)4Cl2·H2O and on concentration ZnCl2(NH3)2. The former contains the Zn(NH3)62+ ion, and the latter is molecular with a distorted tetrahedral geometry. The species in aqueous solution have been investigated and show that Zn(NH3)42+ is the main species present with Zn(NH3)3Cl+ also present at lower NH3:Zn ratio.

Aqueous zinc chloride reacts with zinc oxide to form an amorphous cement that was first investigated in 1855 by Stanislas Sorel. Sorel later went on to investigate the related magnesium oxychloride cement, which bears his name.

When hydrated zinc chloride is heated, one obtains a residue of Zn(OH)Cl e.g.

 ZnCl2·2H2O → ZnCl(OH) + HCl + H2O

The compound ZnCl2·HCl·H2O may be prepared by careful precipitation from a solution of ZnCl2 acidified with HCl. It contains a polymeric anion (Zn2Cl5−) with balancing monohydrated hydronium ions, H5O2+ ions.

Cellulose dissolves in aqueous solutions of ZnCl2, and zinc-cellulose complexes have been detected. Cellulose also dissolves in molten ZnCl2 hydrate and carboxylation and acetylation performed on the cellulose polymer.

Thus, although many zinc salts have different formulas and different crystal structures, these salts behave very similarly in aqueous solution. For example, solutions prepared from any of the polymorphs of ZnCl2, as well as other halides (bromide, iodide), and the sulfate can often be used interchangeably for the preparation of other zinc compounds. Illustrative is the preparation of zinc carbonate:
ZnCl2(aq) + Na2CO3(aq) → ZnCO3(s) + 2 NaCl(aq)

Role in organic chemistry

Zinc chloride is used as a catalyst or reagent in diverse reactions conducted on an industrial scale.  The partial hydrolysis of benzal chloride in the presence of zinc chloride is the main route to benzoyl chloride.  It serves as a catalyst for the production of methylene-bis(dithiocarbamate).

The combination of hydrochloric acid and ZnCl2, known  as the "Lucas reagent", is effective for the preparation of alkyl chlorides from alcohols.  Similar reactions are the basis of industrial routes from methanol and ethanol respectively to methyl chloride and ethyl chloride.

Laboratory syntheses
Zinc chloride is a common reagent in the laboratory useful Lewis acid in organic chemistry.  

Molten zinc chloride catalyses the conversion of methanol to hexamethylbenzene:
15  →  + 3  + 15 

Other examples include catalyzing (A) the Fischer indole synthesis, and also (B) Friedel-Crafts acylation reactions involving activated aromatic rings

Related to the latter is the classical preparation of the dye fluorescein from phthalic anhydride and resorcinol, which involves a Friedel-Crafts acylation. This transformation has in fact been accomplished using even the hydrated ZnCl2 sample shown in the picture above.

Zinc chloride also activates benzylic and allylic halides towards substitution by weak nucleophiles such as alkenes:

In similar fashion, ZnCl2 promotes selective NaBH3CN reduction of tertiary, allylic or benzylic halides to the corresponding hydrocarbons.

Zinc chloride is also a useful starting reagent for the synthesis of many organozinc reagents, such as those used in the palladium catalyzed Negishi coupling with aryl halides or vinyl halides. In such cases the organozinc compound is usually prepared by transmetallation from an organolithium or a Grignard reagent, for example:

Zinc enolates, prepared from alkali metal enolates and ZnCl2, provide control of stereochemistry in aldol condensation reactions due to chelation on to the zinc. In the example shown below, the threo product was favored over the erythro by a factor of 5:1 when ZnCl2 in DME/ether was used. The chelate is more stable when the bulky phenyl group is pseudo-equatorial rather than pseudo-axial, i.e., threo rather than erythro.

Other uses

As a metallurgical flux
The use of zinc chloride as a flux, sometimes in a mixture with ammonium chloride (see also Zinc ammonium chloride), involves the production of HCl and its subsequent reaction with surface oxides. 

Zinc chloride reacts with metal oxides (MO) to give derivatives of the idealized formula MZnOCl2.  This reaction is relevant to the utility of ZnCl2 solution as a flux for soldering — it dissolves passivating oxides, exposing the clean metal surface. Fluxes with ZnCl2 as an active ingredient are sometimes called "tinner's fluid".

Zinc chloride forms two salts with ammonium chloride: (NH4)2ZnCl4 and (NH4)3ClZnCl4, which decompose on heating liberating HCl, just as zinc chloride hydrate does. The action of zinc chloride/ammonium chloride fluxes, for example, in the hot-dip galvanizing process produces H2 gas and ammonia fumes.

In textile and paper processing
Concentrated aqueous solutions of zinc chloride (more than 64% weight/weight zinc chloride in water) have  dissolving starch, silk, and cellulose.

Relevant to its affinity for these materials, ZnCl2 is used as a fireproofing agent and in fabric "refresheners" such as Febreze. Vulcanized fibre is made by soaking paper in concentrated zinc chloride.

Smoke grenades
The zinc chloride smoke mixture ("HC") used in smoke grenades contains zinc oxide, hexachloroethane and granular aluminium powder, which, when ignited, react to form zinc chloride, carbon and aluminium oxide smoke, an effective smoke screen.

Fingerprint detection
Ninhydrin reacts with amino acids and amines to form a colored compound "Ruhemann's purple" (RP). Spraying with a zinc chloride solution forms a 1:1 complex RP:ZnCl(H2O)2, which is more readily detected as it fluoresces more intensely than RP.

Disinfectant and wood preservative
Dilute aqueous zinc chloride was used as a disinfectant under the name "Burnett's Disinfecting Fluid".
 From 1839 Sir William Burnett promoted its use as a disinfectant as well as a wood preservative. The Royal Navy conducted trials into its use as a disinfectant in the late 1840s, including during the cholera epidemic of 1849; and at the same time experiments were conducted into its preservative properties as applicable to the shipbuilding and railway industries. Burnett had some commercial success with his eponymous fluid.  Following his death however, its use was largely superseded by that of carbolic acid and other proprietary products.

Safety 
Zinc chloride is a chemical irritant of the eyes, skin, and respiratory system.

Additional reading
N. N. Greenwood, A. Earnshaw, Chemistry of the Elements, 2nd ed., Butterworth-Heinemann, Oxford, UK, 1997.

The Merck Index, 7th edition, Merck & Co, Rahway, New Jersey, USA, 1960.
D. Nicholls, Complexes and First-Row Transition Elements, Macmillan Press, London, 1973.
J. March, Advanced Organic Chemistry, 4th ed., p. 723, Wiley, New York, 1992.
G. J. McGarvey, in Handbook of Reagents for Organic Synthesis, Volume 1: Reagents, Auxiliaries and Catalysts for C-C Bond Formation, (R. M. Coates, S. E. Denmark, eds.), pp. 220–3, Wiley, New York, 1999.

References

External links
Grades and Applications of Zinc Chloride
PubChem ZnCl2 summary.

zinc
chloride
Inorganic compounds
Metal halides
Deliquescent substances